John Goodsall (15 February 1953 – 10 November 2021) was a British-American progressive rock and jazz fusion guitarist most noted for his work with Brand X, Atomic Rooster, and The Fire Merchants.

Life and career
Goodsall was born in Middlesex, England in February 1953, and has lived in England, Los Angeles, Milan and Minnesota. He began playing guitar at age 7. At 15, he became a professional musician and joined Carol Grimes' Babylon, with members of Joe Cocker's Grease Band, Juicy Lucy and Jon Hiseman's Colosseum. He then toured extensively, first with The Alan Bown Set, then with Atomic Rooster. For his stint with Atomic Rooster, he adopted the pseudonym "Johnny Mandala."

After Brand X's 1979 world tour (the last with Phil Collins), Goodsall moved to Los Angeles and worked as a session musician and as a member of the band Zoo Drive (1980–1987) which included Doug Lunn, Paul Delph and Atomic Rooster drummer Ric Parnell. Goodsall also performed and/or recorded with Bill Bruford, Desmond Dekker & The Aces, Peter Gabriel, Bryan Adams and Toni Basil. In 1992, he also toured with bandmate Percy Jones and Ronnie Ciago, accompanying Swiss keyboardist Patrick Moraz.

The Fire Merchants released two albums, Fire Merchants and Landlords of Atlantis before Goodsall and Percy Jones re-formed Brand X as a trio in 1992 with drummer Frank Katz. Katz was in Jones' band Tunnels with whom Goodsall also recorded on their album Progressivity. This Brand X line-up released X-Communication and Manifest Destiny, which also featured Tunnels' midi-vibes player Marc Wagnon and some keyboards and composition by Franz Pusch. John Goodsall and Franz Pusch continued to work mostly in studio, recently on Franz's music with drummer Ronnie Ciago and Yes bassist Billy Sherwood. Pusch produced The Fire Merchants self-titled debut album with Goodsall, Doug Lunn (bass) and Chester Thompson (drums). This trio was featured on Tamiya Lynn's album Silk and other projects.

Most of the keyboard/synthesiser sounds however in the Brand X and Fire Merchants trios were triggered by Goodsall's MIDI guitar. In 1997, Brand X embarked on a three-month tour of Europe and Japan as a quartet with John Goodsall, Percy Jones, keyboardist Kris Sjobring from Goodsall's L.A. based group Trancendental Medication, and drummer Pierre Moerlen from Gong. Later versions of this group released The X-Files and Missing Period.  They played the west coast again in 1999 including a headline show at Progfest in San Francisco's Golden Gate Park.

He played live with John Goodsall's Ghost Society in 2008. Later albums featuring Goodsall included Franz Pusch Only Visions and Leon Alvarado Strangers in Strange Places. During his last years, Goodsall continued to record on sessions for international projects in Japan, Germany, England, the U.S. and France.

Goodsall had two daughters, Germaine and Natasha. He died on 10 November 2021, at the age of 68.

Performance history
John Goodsall:[Guitars, Midi Guitar] Performed live and-or recorded with Brand X, Bryan Adams, Jeff Beck, The Alan Bown Set, James Bracken, Leon Alvarado, Loughty Amao, Rod Argent, Atomic Rooster, Toni Basil, King Sunny Ade's African Beats, Bill Bruford, Carol Grimes' Babylon, Celebrity Skin, Ava Cherry, Eric Clapton, Mike Clark, Billy Cobham, Todd Cochran, Phil Collins, Paulinho Da Costa, The Cruisers, Lisa Dal Bello, Desmond Dekker and The Aces, Paul Delph, Micheal Des Barres, Dr. John, Mick Fleetwood, The Fire Merchants, Flea, Andy Fraser, Peter Gabriel, Roscoe Gee, Kevin Gilbert, Donni Harvey, Rupert Hine, Eddie Howell, Diana Hubbard, Billy Idol, Mark Isham, Liquid Junior, Quantum Jump, John Kay, Cheryl Ladd, Gaspar Lawal, Karen Lawrence, Long Beach Mercenaries, Tamiya Lynn, Melissa Manchester, John Martyn, Junior Marvin, Bette Midler, Patrick Moraz, Billy Preston, Franz Pusch, X-Ray Spex, Chester Thompson, Alphonso Johnson, Jan Hammer, Anthony Phillips, The Reactors, Nona Hendrix, Sylvia St. James, Jack Lancaster, Terry Reid, Katey Sagal, Sandoz, Hunt Sales, Tony Sales, Jamie Sherriff, Micheal Shrieve, Jimmie Spheris, Blue Thunder, Top Topham, Tunnels, Chuck Turner's Turneround, Lee Ving, Bill Ward Band, The Weather Girls, Wilding/Bonus etc.

Goodsall also played on several film scores including No Small Affair, The Doorman, Can't Buy Me Love, North Shore, Anal Intruder 9, Wave Warriors 2, Wave Warriors 3, and Point Break.

Discography

Brand X

Studio
 Unorthodox Behaviour (1976)
 Moroccan Roll (1977)
 Masques (1978)
 Product (1979)
 Do They Hurt? (1980)
 Is There Anything About? (1982)
 Xcommunication (1992)
 Manifest Destiny (1997)
 Missing Period (1998)

Live
 Livestock (1977)
 Live at the Roxy LA (1979, released 1995)
 But Wait, There's Still more! (2017)
 Locked and Loaded  (2018)

Compilation
 X-Files: A 20 Year Retrospective (1999), compilation including side projects
 Timeline (2000)
 Trilogy (2003)

Atomic Rooster
 Nice 'n' Greasy (1973)

Bill BrufordFeels Good to Me (1978)

Fire Merchants
 Fire Merchants (1989) John Goodsall/Doug Lunn/Chester Thompson
 Landlords of Atlantis (1994) John Goodsall/Doug Lunn/Toss Panos

Long Beach Mercenaries
 Greasy Fingers [Long Beach Mercenaries](2000)

Tamiya Lynn
 SilkFranz Pusch
 Only Visions (2010)

Leon Alvarado
 Strangers in Strange Places (2011)

Cymbalic Encounters
 "1" (2013) 
 "2" (2015)

Session work with Zoo DriveWord of Mouth – Toni Basil (1982) featuring "Mickey"Drastic Measures – Lisa Dalbello (1981)Lifetimes – Diana Hubbard (1979)I'm Only Human – Michael Des Barres (1980)Spheeris – Jimmie Spheeris (1984)Streetcar Named Desire – Ava Cherry (1981)A God That Can Dance – Paul Delph (1996)Targets'' – Jamie Sherriff

References

External links

John Goodsall on Myspace Music
Artist biography from Buckyball Records
Atomic Rooster John Goodsall page at angelfire.com
Brand X on Allmusic.com
John Goodsall - Blazing new trails (interview at innerviews.org)

1953 births
2021 deaths
Atomic Rooster members
Brand X members
English rock guitarists
People from Middlesex